Speotrechus mayeti is a species of beetle in the family Carabidae, the only species in the genus Speotrechus.

References

Trechinae